was the twenty-fourth (and last) s, or the fourth (and last) of the  (if that sub-class is considered independently), built for the Imperial Japanese Navy in the inter-war period. When introduced into service, these ships were the most powerful destroyers in the world. They remained formidable weapons systems well into the Pacific War.

History
Construction of the advanced Fubuki-class destroyers was authorized as part of the Imperial Japanese Navy's expansion program from fiscal 1923, intended to give Japan a qualitative edge with the world's most modern ships. The Fubuki class had performance that was a quantum leap over previous destroyer designs, so much so that they were designated . The large size, powerful engines, high speed, large radius of action and unprecedented armament gave these destroyers the firepower similar to many light cruisers in other navies.  The Akatsuki sub-class was an improved version of the Fubuki, externally almost identical, but incorporating changes to her propulsion system.

Inazuma, built at the Fujinagata Shipyards in Osaka was the fourth (and last) in the “Type III” improved series of Fubuki destroyers, incorporating a modified gun turret which could elevate her main battery of Type 3 127 mm 50 caliber naval guns to 75° as opposed to the original 40°, thus permitting the guns to be used as dual purpose guns against aircraft. Inazuma was laid down on 7 March 1930, launched on 25 February 1932 and commissioned on 15 November 1932.

Operational history
Soon after completion, on 9 June 1934, Inazuma collided with the destroyer  on 29 June while on maneuvers off Cheju Island. The collision sank Miyuki and severed the bow of Inazuma, which was towed to Sasebo Naval Arsenal by the heavy cruiser  for extensive repairs.

World War II history
At the time of the attack on Pearl Harbor, Inazuma was assigned to Destroyer Division 6 of Desron 1 of the IJN 1st Fleet, and had deployed from Mako Guard District to provide cover for landing operations in the Invasion of Hong Kong.

After the start of 1942, Inazuma deployed from Hong Kong to Davao, providing cover for landing operations during the Battle of Manado in the Netherlands East Indies. On 20 January, Inazuma collided with the transport Sendai Maru at Davao, and suffered considerable damage, which was later repaired by the repair ship  until further work could be performed at Mako.

On 1 March, Inazuma was involved in the Second Battle of the Java Sea, where she assisted in the  sinking of the British destroyer  and the cruiser , which she hit with two torpedoes. She then rescued 400 odd survivors from Exeter that same day. Two days later, just before midnight on 3 March, she rescued the entire crew from the American destroyer  (except one that had died just prior to abandoning ship) who had been in the water for almost 60 hours, having been sunk about two hours after Exeter and Encounter on 1 March. After assisting in operations in the Philippines later in March, she returned to Yokosuka Naval Arsenal for repairs in April.

Inazuma deployed from Ōminato Guard District in support of Admiral Boshirō Hosogaya’s Northern Force in the Aleutians campaign, patrolling waters around Kiska and Attu during June and July, and rescuing 36 survivors from the torpedoed destroyer . She continued to be assigned to northern patrols in the Chishima islands and Aleutian islands through the end of August.

From October, Inazuma escorted these aircraft carriers to Truk, and patrolled from Truk to the northern Solomon Islands.

After the battle, Inazuma was based at Truk, and used for numerous “Tokyo Express" high speed transport runs throughout the Solomon Islands.

After repairs were completed in February, she was assigned back to Ōminato to resume patrols of northern waters, and was at the Battle of the Komandorski Islands in March, albeit as escort for transports and away from the main combat. From April through the end of 1943, Inazuma escorted numerous convoys between Yokosuka and Truk.

In February 1944, Inazuma was reassigned to the Combined Fleet, and from March served primarily as escort for the aircraft carrier  on various missions from Palau.

Her sister ship Hibiki rescued the survivors (121 or 125 depending on the source).

On 10 June 1944, Inazuma was removed from the navy list.

Notes

References

External links

 

Akatsuki-class destroyers (1931)
1932 ships
World War II destroyers of Japan
Maritime incidents in 1934
Ships sunk by American submarines
Shipwrecks in the Celebes Sea
World War II shipwrecks in the Pacific Ocean
Maritime incidents in May 1944
Ships of the Aleutian Islands campaign
Ships built by Fujinagata Shipyards